Dial 'M' for Motherfucker is an album by the New York City garage punk band Pussy Galore, released in April 1989 by Caroline Records. The song Kicked Out is played in an Episode of House, "Games", when Gregory House plays it to annoy Wilson and later to induce a seizure in a patient.

A music video for the song "Dick Johnson" was directed by Jim Spring and Jens Jurgensen.

Critical reception
Nick Robinson, reviewer of British music newspaper Music Week, noticed that the listeners can find "beneath the clattering rhythms and chunky guitars" "some heady melodies that aching to break free" and if they will be able to "endure the racket", they will discover "some rough diamonds that are quite irresistible." Janiss Garza of Cashbox called album "group’s most accessible record to date" and admitted "that this blend of obscure alternative noise and occasional Stones-through-a-fishbowl stylings totally and utterly confuses" but she liked it.

Track listing

16-20 are taken from the EP Sugarshit Sharp; 15 was added to reissues of the EP under the correct title, "Penetration in the Centerfold."

Personnel
Adapted from the Dial 'M' for Motherfucker liner notes.

Pussy Galore
 Bob Bert – instruments
 Julie Cafritz – instruments
 Neil Hagerty – instruments
 Jon Spencer – lead vocals, instruments, production, design
 Kurt Wolf – instruments

Production and additional personnel
 Steve Albini – engineering
 Gert-Jan van Avesaath – recording
 Chris Clunn – photography
 Michael Lavine – photography
 Cristina Martinez – design
 Wharton Tiers – engineering

Charts

Release history

References

External links 
 

1989 albums
Pussy Galore (band) albums
Caroline Records albums
Albums produced by Steve Albini
Matador Records albums
Mute Records albums